Saji Cheriyan (born 28 May 1965) is an Indian politician from Kerala. He currently serves as the Member of the Legislative Assembly (MLA) from Chengannur constituency. He was the former Minister for Fisheries, Culture and Youth Affairs (2021 – 2022) in the Second Vijayan ministry.Following a controversial speech in Mallappally in 2022 in which he spoke derisively of the Indian constitution, he resigned on July 6 amid mounting pressure from the opposition.

Early life
Saji Cherian was born on 28 May 1965 to T. T. Cherian and Sosamma Cherian. He hails from Kozhuvalloor in Alappuzha district of Kerala, India. He graduated from Bishop Moore College, Mavelikkara and Kerala Law Academy Law College, Thiruvananthapuram.

Political career 
Cheriyan's entry into politics was through Students' Federation of India (SFI). He did his graduation from Bishop Moore College, Mavelikara. He held positions of Alappuzha district committee secretary and president of SFI. He then went on to become the district committee president and secretary of DYFI, district president of CITU, chairman of the District Panchayat Development permanent committee, president of Chengannur Block Panchayat, president of CPI(M) Alappuzha district committee, syndicate member of the University of Kerala, president of district Sports Council, president of Alappuzha District Co-operative Bank, and executive member of Kerala State Cooperative Bank.

He has contested Kerala Legislative Assembly from Chengannur constituency in 2006 and lost to P. C. Vishnunath of Indian National Congress by a margin of 5321 votes. He was elected to Kerala Legislative Assembly from Chengannur constituency in the by-election held on 28 May 2018 necessitated by the demise of K. K. Ramachandran Nair. He won with a margin of 20956 votes defeating Adv. D. Vijayakumar of Indian National Congress. Saji Cheriyan has recorded the best winning-margin for an LDF candidate in an Assembly election in Chengannur.

On 17 August 2018, his controversial Facebook post went viral among social media, stating his helplessness and request to the central government, regarding his constituency, which was at a highly dangerous zone during 2018 Kerala floods. In the aftermath, actions were taken in order to save Chengannur.

In 2021 assembly elections, Saji was again elected from Chengannur assembly constituency by defeating his nearest Indian National Congress rival M. Murali with margin of more than 30000 votes and became the Minister in charge of the portfolios of Fisheries, Harbour Engineering cultural affairs and cinema in Pinarayi Vijayan ministry 2021.

In July 2022 at Mallappally he made a controversial speech in which it is alleged that he spoke derisively about the Indian Constitution and thus had violated his oath as a Minister and MLA. He resigned his post as Minister on July 6, 2022.

Personal life
He is married to Christeena S. Cherian and they have three children–Dr. Nithya, Dr. Drishya, and Shravya. He resides in Kozhuvalloor in Alappuzha district. He became the chairman of Karuna Pain and Palliative Care Society, a charitable society.

Controversies
In July 2022, Cheriyan made controversy by ridiculing the Indian Constitution and said it condoned exploitation of workers, triggering condemnation and demands for his resignation. Inaugurating the 100th episode of a Facebook live programme on "political developments of the week" organised by Mallappally CPM area committee, Cheriyan alleged that the Constitution was "compiled by the British" and it was written as such by an Indian and implemented in the country for the last 75 years.

References

External links 
 Saji Cherain at Niyamasabha.nic.in

Kerala MLAs 2011–2016
Communist Party of India (Marxist) politicians from Kerala
Living people
People from Alappuzha district
Kerala MLAs 2016–2021
1965 births